Reza Hosseini (‎; 8 May 1960 – 19 August 2003) was a relief worker who was killed in the Canal Hotel bombing in Iraq. His colleagues valued him for his 'joie de vivre' and great operational skill:  “He had an air of confidence that there were no problems that couldn’t be overcome. And that confidence was contagious,” one colleague wrote. Everyone who ever met him remembers his smile, which would light up the room.

After moving out of the private sector, he worked for the United Nations High Commissioner for Refugees in Iran.  He became the Chief of Operations at the International Organization for Migration in East Timor before taking up his post as humanitarian affairs officer for the United Nations in Iraq.  He was born in Mashad, Iran, and earned a university degree in Business Administration from the University of Nebraska.  He spoke English, Persian, Indonesian and Spanish.
His wife's name is Zari shakeri born on 16 July 1971
And he had 2 children : 1. a son named Yazdan, He was born on 16 November 1995. 2. a girl named Yasaman, She was born on 14 June 1998.

See also
Attacks on humanitarian workers

Iranian humanitarians
People from Mashhad
University of Nebraska–Lincoln alumni
1960 births
2003 deaths
Iranian terrorism victims
People killed in the Canal Hotel bombing
United Nations High Commissioner for Refugees officials
Iranian officials of the United Nations